Trechinae is a subfamily of ground beetles in the family Carabidae. There are 6 tribes, more than 430 genera, and over 6,700 described species in Trechinae.

Tribes
These six tribes are members of Trechinae:
 Bembidarenini Maddison et al., 2019  (4 genera)
 Bembidiini Stephens, 1827  (more than 120 genera)
 Pogonini Laporte, 1834  (12 genera)
 Sinozolini Deuve, 1997  (3 genera)
 Trechini Bonelli, 1810  (more than 270 genera)
 Zolini Sharp, 1886  (11 genera)

References

Sources
 LEFHE Laboratory: Laboratoire d'Entomologie Faune Hypogée et Endogée
 WAS Archives (World Archives of Sciences): Trechinae
 RTR (Real Time Reprints): Trechinae
Notes

 
Carabidae subfamilies
Taxa named by Franco Andrea Bonelli